Timor Leste competed at the 2017 Asian Winter Games in Sapporo and Obihiro, Japan from February 19 to 26. This marks the country's official debut at the Asian Winter Games. The country is scheduled to compete with one athlete in alpine skiing.

As the country's only athlete, alpine skier Yohan Goutt Gonçalves, was the country's flagbearer during the parade of nations at the opening ceremony.

Competitors
The following table lists the Timor-Leste delegation per sport and gender.

Alpine skiing

Timor-Leste's sole athlete will compete is 2014 Winter Olympics participant, Yohan Goutt Gonçalves.

Man

See also
Timor Leste at the 2014 Winter Olympics

References

2017
Nations at the 2017 Asian Winter Games
2017 in East Timorese sport